Mattias Olof Svanberg (born 5 January 1999) is a Swedish professional footballer who plays as a midfielder for VfL Wolfsburg and the Sweden national team.

Club career
After playing for LB07 and Malmö FF youth teams Mattias Svanberg signed an apprenticeship contract with Malmö FF on 27 July 2015. As a 16-year-old, he featured on the bench four times during the 2015 season. On 4 March 2016, he signed a four-year first team contract with Malmö. He made his Allsvenskan debut on 28 May 2016 when he came on as a substitute in the 82nd minute in a 4–1 win against Östersunds FK, and assisted on Viðar Örn Kjartansson's goal in stoppage time. On 25 September 2016, he scored his first Allsvenskan goal in the local derby against Helsingborgs IF. He started his first game for the club on 26 October 2016, and scored a goal and an assist as Malmö FF beat Falkenbergs FF to secure the Allsvenskan title.

In 2017, Svanberg received a larger role with the team and made 21 appearances as MFF won the championship for a second consecutive year. In 2018, Svanberg became a consistent starter and was one of only two players to feature in every match during the spring before moving to Serie A club Bologna F.C. 1909 in the summer transfer window for a sum of €5 million.

He made his Serie A debut on 16 September 2018 in a 0–1 defeat against Genoa C.F.C.

On 16 July 2022, Bundesliga club VfL Wolfsburg announced the signing of Svanberg on a five-year deal.

International career
Svanberg was called up to the senior Sweden squad for games against Turkey and Russia in November 2018, but did not play.

In November 2019, Svanberg was called up for Sweden's UEFA Euro 2020 qualification matches against Romania and Faroe Islands. On 18 November Svanberg scored on his debut against Faroe Islands at Friends Arena in Solna. He also assisted John Guidetti in a 3–0 win for the home side.

Svanberg was called up for a major tournament for the first time when he was included in Sweden's 26-man squad for UEFA Euro 2020.

Personal life 
He is the son of the former professional ice hockey player Bo Svanberg.

Career statistics

Club

International

 Scores and results list Sweden's goal tally first, score column indicates score after each Svanberg goal.

Honours
Malmö FF
Allsvenskan: 2016, 2017

References

External links
 Profile at the VfL Wolfsburg website
 
 
 

1999 births
Living people
Footballers from Malmö
Association football midfielders
Swedish footballers
Sweden youth international footballers
Sweden under-21 international footballers
Sweden international footballers
Footballers from Skåne County
Malmö FF players
Bologna F.C. 1909 players
VfL Wolfsburg players
Allsvenskan players
Serie A players
UEFA Euro 2020 players
Swedish expatriate footballers
Expatriate footballers in Italy
Swedish expatriate sportspeople in Italy
Expatriate footballers in Germany
Swedish expatriate sportspeople in Germany